{{DISPLAYTITLE:C8H16}}
The molecular formula C8H16 (molar mass: 112.21 g/mol, exact mass: 112.1252 u) may refer to:

 Cyclooctane
 Methylcycloheptane
 Dimethylcyclohexanes
 
 Octenes
 1-Octene

Molecular formulas